Kabudlar (also Romanized as Kabūdlar; also known as Kabūdeh-ye Dehjū and Jūb Now-ye Kabūdlar) is a village in Zagheh Rural District, Zagheh District, Khorramabad County, Lorestan Province, Iran. At the 2006 census, its population was 71, in 15 families.

References 

Towns and villages in Khorramabad County